Sir George Hamilton Seymour  (21 September 1797 – 2 February 1880) was a British diplomat.

Seymour was the son of Lord George Seymour and his wife Isabella, daughter of Rev. George Hamilton. In 1831 he married Gertrude, daughter of Henry Trevor (who later became General Lord Dacre); they had seven children. His daughter, Augusta Emily Seymour, married Hugh Cholmondeley, 2nd Baron Delamere of Vale Royal (b. 3 Oct 1811, d. 1 Aug 1887). He died in February 1880, aged 82.

References

External links

Portrait of Sir George Hamilton Seymour  by Ferdinand Georg Waldmüller in the British Government Art Collection

1797 births
1880 deaths
Alumni of Merton College, Oxford
Ambassadors of the United Kingdom to Austria
Ambassadors of the United Kingdom to Belgium
Ambassadors of the United Kingdom to Portugal
Ambassadors of the United Kingdom to Russia
Burials at Kensal Green Cemetery
Gentlemen Ushers
Knights Grand Cross of the Order of the Bath
Members of the Privy Council of the United Kingdom
People educated at Eton College
Principal Private Secretaries to the Secretary of State for Foreign and Commonwealth Affairs
George
Onslow family